In number theory, Polignac's conjecture was made by Alphonse de Polignac in 1849 and states:
For any positive even number n, there are infinitely many prime gaps of size n. In other words: There are infinitely many cases of two consecutive prime numbers with difference n.

Although the conjecture has not yet been proven or disproven for any given value of n, in 2013 an important breakthrough was made by Zhang Yitang who proved that there are infinitely many prime gaps of size n for some value of n < 70,000,000. Later that year, James Maynard announced a related breakthrough which proved that there are infinitely many prime gaps of some size less than or equal to 600. As of April 14, 2014, one year after Zhang's announcement, according to the Polymath project wiki, n has been reduced to 246. Further, assuming the Elliott–Halberstam conjecture and its generalized form, the Polymath project wiki states that n has been reduced to 12 and 6, respectively.

For n = 2, it is the twin prime conjecture. For n = 4, it says there are infinitely many cousin primes (p, p + 4). For n = 6, it says there are infinitely many sexy primes (p, p + 6) with no prime between p and p + 6.

Dickson's conjecture generalizes Polignac's conjecture to cover all prime constellations.

Conjectured density 
Let  for even n be the number of prime gaps of size n below x.

The first Hardy–Littlewood conjecture says the asymptotic density is of form

where Cn is a function of n, and  means that the quotient of two expressions tends to 1 as x approaches infinity.

C2 is the twin prime constant

where the product extends over all prime numbers p ≥ 3.

Cn is C2 multiplied by a number which depends on the odd prime factors q of n:

For example, C4 = C2  and C6 = 2C2. Twin primes have the same conjectured density as cousin primes, and half that of sexy primes.

A heuristic argument follows. It relies on some unproven assumptions so the conclusion remains a conjecture. This equals  which transfers to the conjectured prime density. In the case of n = 6, the argument simplifies to: If a is a random number then 3 has chance 2/3 of dividing a or a + 2, but only chance 1/3 of dividing a and a + 6, so the latter pair is conjectured twice as likely to both be prime.

Notes

References 
Alphonse de Polignac, Recherches nouvelles sur les nombres premiers. Comptes Rendus des Séances de l'Académie des Sciences (1849)

Conjectures about prime numbers
Unsolved problems in number theory